Creegbrawse is a hamlet in west Cornwall, England, United Kingdom. It is situated between the villages of Chacewater (where the 2011 census population was included ) and Todpool approximately three miles (5 km) east of Redruth.

Creegbrawse was a busy mining area in the 19th century. Remains of the mining activity are still present including numerous mineshafts. Since the decline of the industry, the village has become a rural community centred on a crossroads; the roads lead to Chacewater, Twelveheads, Todpool and St Day via Little Beside.

References

External links

Hamlets in Cornwall